Lars Håkon Andersen (born 13 January 1974) is a former Norwegian ice hockey player. He was born in Fredrikstad, Norway. He played for the Norwegian national ice hockey team at the 1994 Winter Olympics.

References

1974 births
Frisk Asker Ishockey players
Living people
Ice hockey players at the 1994 Winter Olympics
Lillehammer IK players
Norwegian ice hockey players
Olympic ice hockey players of Norway
Sportspeople from Fredrikstad
Stjernen Hockey players